Serxhio Gjonbrati (born 6 December 1993) is an Albanian professional footballer who plays for Butrinti in the Albanian First Division.

Club career
Gjonbrati joined Bylis after three seasons at Himara in summer 2014.

References

1993 births
Living people
Footballers from Vlorë
Albanian footballers
Association football defenders
Flamurtari Vlorë players
KF Himara players
KF Bylis Ballsh players
KF Butrinti players
Kategoria Superiore players
Kategoria e Parë players